China–Turkey relations are the international relations between China and Turkey. Current official relations were established in 1934 and Turkey recognized the People's Republic of China (PRC) on 5 August 1971.

Turkey conforms to the One-China policy and recognizes the PRC as the sole legal representative of China. China has an embassy in Ankara, and a consulate–general in Istanbul whereas Turkey has an embassy in Beijing and consulate–generals in Hong Kong, Guangzhou and Shanghai. China is a founding and the leading member of the Shanghai Cooperation Organization while Turkey is a dialogue partner.

History

Ancient history
Historically, Chinese relations with Turkic nomadic tribes encompassed many different facets that affected their relations, although the relationship by far was mostly described in a negative light. This was stemmed by historical wars between various Chinese dynasties against various Turkic entities by that time, began from the Han–Xiongnu War when the Xiongnu, the ancestors of modern Turkic and Mongolian nomadic tribes, conflicted with Han dynasty.

The conflict between nomadic people, which the Turks were part of, and the Chinese, intensified under the Tang dynasty, when the Tang dynasty launched two punitive expeditions against Turkic people (Tang campaign against the Eastern Turks and Tang campaigns against the Western Turks), as well as the Turks allied with Korean Goguryeo against China. The Tang won both campaigns, and also destroyed Xueyantuo, Second Turkic Khaganate and Uighur Khanate with the help of its allies. On the other hand, China failed to eliminate Turkic resistance, which was detrimental of paving the way to the defeats of the dynasty and Chinese power. During the Battle of Talas, the Turks betrayed the Chinese Empire and joined the Arabs, ultimately expelled the Chinese out of Central Asia.

Ottoman relations with China
In the 16th century, there emerged travelogues of both Ottoman travelers to China, such as the merchant Ali Akbar and Chinese travelers to the Ottoman world, such as the scholar-official Ma Li, often portraying each other's empires as being highly similar to their own. A 16th century Chinese gazetteer, Shaanxi tongzhi, claims that there were Han-Chinese people living in a number of Ottoman controlled towns and cities such as Beirut, Tartus, Konya, and Istanbul.

According to the official history of the Ming dynasty, some self-proclaimed Ottoman envoys visited Beijing to pay tribute to the Ming emperor in 1524. However, these envoys were most likely just Central and Western Asian merchants trying to conduct trade in China, since pretending to be envoys was the only way to enter the Chinese border pass. One of these merchants was Ali Akbar Khitai, who visited the Ming dynasty during the reign of Emperor Zhengde. Ali Akbar later wrote the book Khitay namah and dedicated it to Sultan Suleiman. The Ming Shilu also records Ottoman envoys reaching China in 1423, 1425, 1427, 1443–1445, 1459, 1525–1527, 1543–1544, 1548, 1554, 1559, 1564, 1576, 1581, and 1618. Some of these missions may have been from Uzbekistan, Moghulistan, or Kara Del because the Ottomans were known in China as the rulers of five realms: Turfan, Samarqand, Mecca, Rum and Hami.

According to traders in the Gujarat Sultanate, the Chinese Emperor ordered all Chinese Muslims  to read the khutba in the name of the Ottoman Sultan, thus preventing religious disputes from spreading across his territory.

Kaiser Wilhelm II was so alarmed by the Chinese Muslim troops in the Boxer Rebellion that he requested the Caliph Abdul Hamid II of the Ottoman Empire to find a way to stop the Muslim troops from fighting. The Caliph agreed to the Kaiser's request and sent Enver Pasha (not the future Young Turk leader) to China in 1901, but the rebellion had ended by that time.

Turkey and Republic of China

Turkish government officials received a Chinese Muslim delegation under Wang Zengshan who denounced the Japanese invasion of China.

Turkey and People's Republic of China

in 1950, United Nations Resolution 83 requested military aid for South Korea following its invasion by North Korean forces, which were assisted by China and the Soviet Union.  The 5,000-strong Turkish Brigade was attached to the U.S. 25th Infantry Division, served within United Nations Command. The Turkish Brigade fought in several major actions, including the Battle of Wawon (27–29 November 1950), against elements of the 38th Group Army of the Chinese People's Liberation Army and Battle of Kumyangjang-Ni (25–26 January 1951), against elements of the Chinese 50th Army. The brigade was awarded Unit Citations by both South Korea and the United States.

In 1971, Turkey was one of 76 nations voting in favor of restoring UN membership to the Chinese government.

On 28 November 2008, Jia Qinglin, China's top political advisor and the chairman of the People's Political Consultative Conference, gave an official goodwill visit to Turkey as guest of Turkish Parliament Speaker Köksal Toptan. In Ankara, Jia met Turkish President Abdullah Gül and Prime Minister Recep Tayyip Erdoğan. After visiting Ankara, Jia attended a business forum entitled "Turkish-Chinese Economic and Commercial Opportunities Forum" in İstanbul.

Turkish President Abdullah Gül has become the first Turkish president to visit China in 14 years with his official visit between 24 and 29 June 2009. Gül said one of the major goals of his visit was to boost economic relations. In Beijing, Gül hold talks with his Chinese counterpart Hu Jintao and attended a Turkey-China business forum. Following the meetings, seven cooperation agreements were signed between the two countries in the fields of energy, banking, finance and culture. After Beijing, Gül visited Xi'an and he was awarded with an honorary doctorate by the Xian Northwest University. In the third leg of his China trip, Gül visited Shenzhen. Upon an invitation of the Beijing administration, Gül also visited Ürümqi and has become the first Turkish president visiting Xinjiang Uyghur Autonomous Region.

On 7 October 2010, China and Turkey signed eight cooperation agreements relating to trade, cultural and technical exchange, marine cooperation, and other things. At the signing ceremony attended by both of the countries' prime ministers, both pledged to increase bilateral trade to $50 billion by 2015, and to cooperate in building high-speed rail to link Ankara to Istanbul. Later in November, Turkish Foreign Minister Ahmet Davutoğlu toured China for six days and met with his counterpart Yang Jiechi, after Chinese premier Wen Jiabao visited Turkey and upgraded the China–Turkey relationship to a "strategic partnership". Among the joint pledges the foreign ministers made in China were to start a Turkish industrial zone in Xinjiang and to jointly crack down on separatism and terrorism, including on anti-China separatist activities in Turkey. Commentators have cited these stronger ties as further proof of a realignment of Turkish foreign policy to the "East".

In 2017, the Chinese ambassador to Turkey Yu Hongyang said that China is ready to discuss Turkey's membership to the Shanghai Cooperation Organization.

In April 2019, China was the first country to congratulate Ekrem İmamoğlu after he became the mayor of Istanbul. Ekrem İmamoğlu told the Chinese Consul General in Istanbul Cui Wei that the political, economic, trade and cultural relations between China and Turkey are very good and important.

In July 2019, when Turkish President Erdoğan visited China, he said "It is a fact that the people of all ethnicities in Xinjiang are leading a happy life amid China's development and prosperity". Erdoğan also said that some people were seeking to "abuse" the Xinjiang crisis to jeopardize "Turkish-Chinese relationship". Beijing also invited Turkish reporters to tour the Xinjiang re-education camps. The state-run tabloid Global Times described the camps as a model for counter-terrorism and a "paradise" for the Uyghurs. A delegation from the Turkish Foreign Ministry was also expected to visit the camps.

China criticized the 2019 Turkish offensive into north-eastern Syria. China's Foreign Ministry spokesperson stated that China held "Syria's sovereignty, independence and territorial integrity must be respected and upheld", noted that several sides had "expressed concerns" over Turkey's military operation and urged Turkey to "exercise restraint".

On 21 November 2022, Qian Hongshan, deputy head of the International Department of the Chinese Communist Party, visited Istanbul to meet with Ünal Çeviköz, an advisor to Republican People's Party (CHP) leader Kemal Kılıçdaroğlu, as well as Yüksel Mansur Kılınç, MP for the CHP from Istanbul.

China offered monetary support to Turkey after the 2023 Turkey–Syria earthquake. and sent additional personnel to Turkey to help in the relief effort. Chinese leader Xi Jinping, said the country would send aid and medics to the affected regions. The government of China has also announced to offer 30 million yuan ($4.4 million) to Syria and 40 million yuan ($5.9 million) to Turkey as emergency humanitarian assistance.

Economic relations 

In recent years, the economic relationship between Turkey and China have been growing rapidly. In 2000, the total bilateral trade volume between China and Turkey exceeded US$1 billion for the first time. In 2009, the bilateral trade between China and Turkey totaled US$10.079 billion and by 2017, that number increased to US$27 billion. China is Turkey's biggest import partner. Turkey is an active member of the Belt and Road Initiative program.

In June 2019, the People's Bank of China transferred $1 billion worth of funds to Turkey to help the Turkish economy. Later in September, China Development Bank granted a $200 million loan to the Industrial and Development Bank of Turkey.
According to a recent study, the increasing economic cooperation between China and Turkey is shaped by interest-driven calculations to bolster AKP's power internally and internationally.

Cultural relations 
China and Turkey signed a cultural cooperation agreement in November 1993. The exchange programs include sports, education and news.

2018 was the "Year of Turkey" in China. A song created by Xiao Zhang called "I want to take you to romantic Turkey" became one of the most popular songs in China.

Chinese tourists to Turkey increased from 98 thousand in 2011 to 300 thousand in 2015 and to 400 thousand in 2018, marking a 537% increase in the last 10 years. The Turkish government is expecting this number to go up to 1 million in the following years. In the first eight months of 2019, 292,322 Chinese tourists visited Turkey, marking a 12% increase from last year.

During Erdoğan's visit to China in July 2019, Chinese leader and CPC general secretary Xi Jinping said that China would make it easier for Turkish nationals to get Chinese visas.

Military relations 
Turkey's cooperation with China for the joint development of ballistic missiles began in the late 1990s, when negotiations for the technology transfer and production under license in Turkey of the American M-270 MLRS artillery rocket system failed. After signing a contract for the licensed production of the Chinese WS-1A and WS-1B rockets under the name of Kasırga in 1997, a similar contract was signed with B-611 SRBM system in 1998. Out of this Turkey manufactured the J-600T Yıldırım tactical ballistic missile with Chinese technology.

Chinese Flankers used the Konya facilities to exercise with Turkish F-4E Phantoms between 20 September and 4 October 2010. Turkey does not appear to regard these exercises as part of the official Anatolian Eagle series, despite the media reporting them as such. U.S. officials worried that the exercises would allow the Chinese access to Western technology and an understanding of NATO tactics.

In November 2015, Turkey canceled a HQ-9 missile deal with China, opting instead for a domestically developed  missile defence system. It was reported in 2019 that Turkey is considering buying Shenyang J-31 jets from China because the United States banned selling F-35 jets to Turkey.

Disputes

Treatment of Uyghurs

Rebiya Kadeer claimed that Turkey is hampered from offering support to the Uyghurs because of its own Kurdish conflict, which China may interfere with in retaliation. Turkey has officially designated the East Turkistan Islamic Movement as a terrorist organization. In recent years, China and Turkey have increased cooperation against separatist movements in Xinjiang. Turkey has also increased deportations of Uyghurs to China. In February 2019, the Spokesperson of the Turkish Foreign Ministry denounced China for "violating the fundamental human rights of Uyghur Turks and other Muslim communities in the Xinjiang Uyghur Autonomous Region." In May 2020, an extradition treaty between Turkey and China was faced an uncertain path to ratification in the Grand National Assembly of Turkey. The prospect of the extradition treaty's ratification worries Uyghur activists and human rights groups, who fear that the document could negatively affect Uyghurs living in Turkey. In July 2020, The Daily Telegraph reported that Turkey was sending Uyghur human activists to third countries where they could then be extradited to China.

The ruling AKP in Turkey has different factions; some of which are nationalists who want to confront China over its treatment of Uyghurs, and other members who want to prioritize good relations with China and believe that the Uyghur issue is being abused to spoil relations between China and Turkey by the United States. Some Islamist AKP members have accused Rebiya Kadeer of being an "American agent" and "infidel". Turkey has had to follow its own country's interests first with a pragmatic approach to the situation of Turkic peoples in other countries like Uyghurs, Gagauz, and Crimean Tatars. In recent years, those who want to maintain relations with China have gained the upper hand.

In April 2021, the Chinese ambassador to Turkey was summoned after responding to statements by Turkish politicians Meral Akşener and Mansur Yavaş commemorating those killed in the Baren Township riot in Xinjiang in 1990.

In 2021, Turkish President Tayyip Erdogan received the first dose of Sinovac's COVID-19 vaccine CoronaVac. But Turkey has been accused of agreeing to hand over Uighur to China in exchange for access to its COVID-19 vaccines.

In 2021, Turkish authorities started cracking down on Uyghur protesters in Turkey at the Chinese behest.

Public perceptions 
According to a November 2018 INR poll, 46% of Turks view China favourably, up from 30% in June 2018. The poll also found that 62% of Turks think it important for Turkey to maintain a strong trade relationship with China.

See also
Foreign relations of China
Foreign relations of Turkey
Göktürk-2
Chinese people in Turkey

References

External links
Chinese embassy in Ankara
Turkish embassy in Beijing

 
China
Turkey